Soaring with Eagles at Night, to Rise with the Pigs in the Morning is the second album released by Norwegian band Gluecifer in 1998.

Track listing 
"Bossheaded" - 3:14
"Go Away Man" - 2:47
"The Year of Manly Living" - 4:25
"Get the Horn" - 3:34
"Critical Minute" - 4:13
"Silver Wings" - 3:10
"Lord of the Dusk" - 3:22
"Deadend Beat" - 5:45
"Clean Gone Mean" - 3:26
"Heart of a Bad Machine" - 3:53
"Gimme Solid Gold" - 4:01

1998 albums
Gluecifer albums